Tilia Homes (formerly Kier Living, part of the Kier Group) is a British housebuilding company.

History
Following a failed rights issue in late 2018, financially troubled Kier Group began an extensive restructuring, debt reduction, cost-cutting and disposals programme in 2019, and, after significant interest in its housing division Kier Living, said it had started the sale process; Guy Hands' Terra Firma Capital Partners was later reported to be among the bidders. Sale of the business was slowed by the COVID-19 pandemic in the United Kingdom but by early 2021, it had progressed, with Kier hoping to receive around £100m for the business.

On 6 April 2021, Sky News confirmed that Kier Living would be sold to Terra Firma, for £110m, subject to agreement at a meeting of Kier shareholders in early May, with completion expected by mid-June 2021. Kier Living was bought by a new company owned by Hands,  and was rebranded as Tilia Homes in May 2021. The business completed over 1,100 private and affordable homes in the year to June 2020. It built 1,450 homes across its central, eastern, northern and western regions in the year to June 2021.

In July 2021, Terra Firma bid £700m to buy Keepmoat Homes with a view to combining it with its former Kier Living business. Keepmoat was subsequently acquired by Aermont Capital.

References

External links

2021 establishments in England
British companies established in 2021
Housebuilding companies of the United Kingdom
2021 mergers and acquisitions